Sergio Pérez Moya (born 13 October 1986) is a Mexican former professional footballer who played as a right-back.

Career
He began his career 2005 in his hometown team and made his debut on January 11, 2005, in a game against Tigres UANL, this year Puebla was relegated to Primera A. He helped the team return to Primera División (First Division), since then he is a constant in the starting 11. In 2009, he signed a 4-year contract to play for C.F. Monterrey. In November 2010 he won his first championship with C.F. Monterrey.

Guadalajara
For the Clausura 2013, Sergio Perez was transferred to Chivas on a trade for Omar Arellano who was headed to Monterrey. Cherokee played as a regular starter for Chivas during his first season, as a right back due to the departure of Omar Esparza to San Luis.

Querétaro and Atlante
Pérez signed with Querétaro in 2013 but he was immediately loaned out to Atlante.

Chiapas
On 4 May 2014 Chiapas announced they had signed Pérez on loan from Querétaro.

International Caps 
As of 11 October 2011

Honours
Puebla
Primera A: Apertura 2006, Apertura 2007
Ascenso: Apertura 2007
Copa MX: Clausura 2015

Monterrey
Mexican Primera División: Apertura 2010'''
CONCACAF Champions League: 2010-11, 2011–12

References

External links
Puebla F.C. Player Profile

1986 births
Living people
Mexico international footballers
Footballers from Puebla
Club Puebla players
Indios de Ciudad Juárez footballers
C.F. Monterrey players
C.D. Guadalajara footballers
Atlante F.C. footballers
Liga MX players
Association football defenders
Mexican footballers